This article lists events from the year 2000 in The Bahamas.

Incumbents 
 Monarch: Elizabeth II
 Governor-General: Sir Orvile Turnquest
 Prime Minister: Hubert Ingraham

Events

Deaths
 January 6 - David Mitchell, convicted murderer

See also
List of years in the Bahamas

References

Links

 
2000s in the Bahamas
Years of the 21st century in the Bahamas
Bahamas
Bahamas